Amin ud-din Ahmad Khan (23 March 1911 – 12 June 1983) was the last ruling Nawab of princely state of Loharu, reigning from 1926 to 1947.

Born on 23 March 1911 in Delhi, he studied at Aitchison College, Lahore, later, Member of the Chamber of Princes, and briefly served the Indian Army and saw action during the Liberation of Goa in 1961 .

He was a leader of the regional Indian National Congress party, and became a member of the Legislative Assembly of Rajasthan (MLA), and subsequently the 'Minister Public Works Department', Government of Rajasthan from 1967 to 1976.

He was appointed the 2nd governor of Himachal Pradesh (1977–1981) and 11th governor of Punjab (1981–1982).

He donated the famous and valuable library collection of his family to the Raza Library in Rampur.  He died at New Delhi on 12 June 1983, aged 72.

Personal life 
He had one daughter from his wife, Shahzadi Sultan Begum,
 Mah Bano Begum (Born 1934): married to H. E. Dr. S. M. Koreshi, Ambassador of Pakistan.

He had one daughter from his wife, Saira Begum,
 Shah Bano Begum (Born 1937)

He had three children from his wife, Shaukat Jehan Begum, 
 Ala-uddin Ahmad Khan II (Born 1938): After staying in Kolkata for many years, he now lives in Loharu town 
 Durru Miyan (Born 1944): Indian National Congress politician, member Legislative Assembly of Rajasthan state, settled in Jaipur
 Noor Bano (Born 1939): Married to Syed Zulfiqar Ali Khan of Rampur (Titular Nawab of Rampur), and a member 11th Lok Sabha and  13th Lok Sabha.

Titles
1911–1926: Nawabzada Mirza Amin ud-din Ahmed Khan
1926–1931: His Excellency Fakhr ud-Daula, Nawab Mirza Amin ud-din Ahmad Khan Bahadur, Nawab of Loharu
1931–1934: Second Lieutenant His Excellency Fakhr ud-Daula, Nawab Mirza Amin ud-din Ahmad Khan Bahadur, Nawab of Loharu
1934–1939: Lieutenant His Excellency Fakhr ud-Daula, Nawab Mirza Amin ud-din Ahmad Khan Bahadur, Nawab of Loharu
1939–1948: Captain His Excellency Fakhr ud-Daula, Nawab Mirza Amin ud-din Ahmad Khan Bahadur, Nawab of Loharu
1948–1961: Captain His Highness Fakhr ud-Daula, Nawab Mirza Amin ud-din Ahmad Khan Bahadur, Nawab of Loharu
1961–1983: Major His Highness Fakhr ud-Daula, Nawab Mirza Amin ud-din Ahmad Khan Bahadur, Nawab of Loharu

Honours
King George V Silver Jubilee Medal-1935
King George VI Coronation Medal-1937
Indian Independence Medal-1947

Notes

External links
Genealogy of the Nawabs of Loharu Queensland University

1911 births
Rajasthani politicians
Indian National Congress politicians
Nawabs of India
20th-century Indian Muslims
Aitchison College alumni
People from Bhiwani
Governors of Himachal Pradesh
Governors of Punjab, India
1983 deaths
Indian Army personnel